Ferdinand Maria Innocenz Michael Joseph of Bavaria (5 August 1699 in Brussels – 9 December 1738 in Munich) was a Bavarian prince and an Imperial Field marshal.

Life 
Ferdinand Maria Innocent was a son of Elector Maximilian II Emanuel of Bavaria (1662-1726) from his marriage to Therese Kunigunde Sobieska (1676-1730), a daughter of King John III Sobieski of Poland.

He served as a general in the imperial army.  In 1738, he was promoted to Field marshal and imperial Feldzeugmeister.

He died in 1738 and was buried in the Theatine Church in Munich.

Marriage and issue 
Ferdinand Maria Innocent married on 5 February 1719 in Zákupy to Maria Anna Carolina, a daughter of Philip William August, Count Palatine of Neuburg.  He had the following children:
 Maximilian Francis Joseph (1720–1738)
 Clement Francis de Paula (1722–1770)
 married in 1742 Countess Palatine Maria Anna of Sulzbach (1722–1790)
 Therese Emmanuel (1723–1743)

Ferdinand also had a son from his extra-marital affaire with Countess Marie Adelaide Fortunata Spaur (1694–1781):

 Joseph Ferdinand (1718–1805), general of the regiment "Count of Salern", married:
 in 1753 to Countess Marie Mechthildis of Törring (1734–1764)
 in 1766 to Countess Josepha of La Rosee (d. 1772)

References 
 Johannes Erichsen and Katharina Heinemann (Hrsg.): Die Schlacht von Höchstädt. Brennpunkt Europas 1704, Jan Thorbecke, Ostfildern, 2004,

Footnotes 

Princes of Bavaria
Generals of the Holy Roman Empire
Knights of the Golden Fleece of Austria
House of Wittelsbach
1699 births
1738 deaths
18th-century German people
Field marshals of Germany
Burials at the Theatine Church, Munich
Sons of monarchs
Military personnel from Brussels